Michael John Higham (born 25 April 1970) is a British sound editor, record producer, audio engineer, and composer known for his work in film and television. He won a Primetime Emmy Award for Outstanding Sound Editing for a Limited Series, Movie, or Special for his work on the 2001 HBO miniseries Band of Brothers.

Career 
Higham began his career as a recording engineer for producer Trevor Horn, and worked with artists like Seal, Tina Turner, Eric Clapton, and Sting. Since the late 1990s, he has worked primarily as a music editor and supervisor for feature films; including High Fidelity, Bridget Jones's Diary, Charlie and the Chocolate Factory, Hellboy II: The Golden Army, Captain Phillips, and Edge of Tomorrow. He was co-composer on the Tim Burton 2016 film Miss Peregrine's Home for Peculiar Children, substituting for Burton's usual collaborator Danny Elfman.

Awards and nominations

Won 
 2002 Primetime Emmy Award for Outstanding Sound Editing for a Limited Series, Movie, or Special (for Band of Brothers)
 2017 ASCAP Film and Television Music Award for Top Box Office Films (for Miss Peregrine's Home for Peculiar Children) – with Matthew Margeson
 2001 Golden Reel Award for Best Sound Editing – Music (Foreign & Domestic) (for High Fidelity)

Nominated 
 2016 Golden Reel Award for Best Sound Editing – Music in a Feature Film (for Mission: Impossible – Rogue Nation)
 2015 Golden Reel Award for Best Sound Editing Best Sound Editing – Music in a Musical Feature Film (for Into the Woods)
 2015 Guild of Music Supervisors Award for Best Music Supervision for Films Budgeted Over $25 Million (for Into the Woods) – with Paul Gemignani
 2011 Golden Reel Award for Best Sound Editing – Music in a Feature Film (for Alice in Wonderland)
 2008 Golden Reel Award for Best Sound Editing Best Sound Editing – Music in a Musical Feature Film (for Sweeney Todd: The Demon Barber of Fleet Street)
 2005 Golden Reel Award for Best Sound Editing in Feature Film – Animated (for Corpse Bride)

References 

1970 births
Living people